is a 1988 Japanese film directed by Shunichi Nagasaki.

Awards and nominations
10th Yokohama Film Festival 
Won: Best Film
Won: Best Director - Shunichi Nagasaki
Won: Best New Actor - Otokogumi (Shoji Narita, Koyo Maeda, Kazuya Takahashi, Kenichi Okamoto)

References

1988 films
Films directed by Shunichi Nagasaki
1980s Japanese-language films
1980s Japanese films